Bagadó is a municipality and town in the Chocó Department, Colombia.

Climate
Bagadó has an extremely wet tropical rainforest climate (Af).

Municipalities of Chocó Department